A vittra (plural: vittror) (dialectal: singular; vitt'r, plural indefinitive: vittra, plural definitive; vittran) is a type of vættr (a term for supernatural spirits) from northern Sweden. A vættr is a nature spirit, a type of mythological creature very common in Scandinavian mythology. Experts are not certain if vittra, hulder, and näcken can be grouped together or not because all three of them support nature against humans and dangers.

Origins
The vittra is part of Scandinavian folklore from Sweden, Norway, Denmark, Iceland, the Faroe Islands, and the Swedish speaking parts of Finland. In tales told in the north of Sweden, vittror often take the place that trolls, tomte, and vättar hold in the same stories told in other parts of the country.

Dwellings
Vittror live underground, are invisible most of the time, and have their own cattle (which are also invisible). Most of the time vittror are rather distant and do not meddle in human affairs, but are fearsome when enraged. This can be achieved by not respecting them properly, for example by neglecting to perform certain rituals (such as saying "look out" when putting out hot water or urinating, so they can move out of the way) or building your home to close to or, even worse, on top of their home, disturbing their cattle or blocking their roads. They can make your life very miserable or even dangerous – they do whatever it takes to drive you away, even arrange accidents that will harm or even kill you. Even now, people have rebuilt or moved houses in order not to block a "vittra-way" or moved from houses that are deemed a "vittra-place" (vittraställe) because of bad luck – although this is rather uncommon. It is said the vittra dwells in Norrland, in the high woods or in the fields. However it is unclear if they rule over the field as the skogsrå rules over the grand woods. However in many stories the term "vitt'rkärring" (vitt'r hag/old woman) is used instead of the name skogsrå.

Customs
They are experts at milking both their own cows and men's cows. They usually live underground but sometimes they also live in abandoned human chalets. People believed they could sometimes hear the vittror calling for their cattle or milking and sometimes even the tinkling of their cow's bell. Vittror are believed to sometimes "borrow" cattle that later would be returned to the owner with the ability to give more milk as a sign of gratitude. This tradition is heavily influenced by the fact that it was developed during a time when people let their cattle graze on mountains or in the forest for long periods of the year.

References

External links
http://tyda.se/forum?id=173345 
http://www.shadowcities.com/forum/topic/488/
http://www.paralumun.com/scandinavian-mythology.htm

Scandinavian legendary creatures
Nature spirits
Swedish folklore

no:Hulder